The Road Less Travelled is the eighth studio album by Australian country music singer, Graeme Connors. It was released in August 1996 and peaked at number 62 on the ARIA charts.

At the ARIA Music Awards of 1997, the album won the ARIA Award for Best Country Album.

Track listing

Charts

Certifications

References 

1996 albums
ARIA Award-winning albums